Davis Miller is an American author, notable for a series of works that combine reportage and autobiography.  Miller's books include The Tao of Muhammad Ali and The Tao of Bruce Lee:  a martial arts memoir, both of which have been number-one bestsellers in the United Kingdom and Japan, as well as The Zen of Muhammad Ali:  and other obsessions, a collection of personal essays, memoir and short fiction that was published exclusively in the U.K., where it was a number-eight bestseller. His most recent book is Approaching Ali:  A Reclamation in Three Acts, which was published on 1 March 2016 in the United States and the United Kingdom, and on 3 September 2016 as En Busca de Muhammad Ali in Spain. His story 'My Dinner with Ali' was judged one of the twenty best magazine stories of the 20th Century.

Works

"My Dinner with Ali"
The Sunday Magazine Editors Association judged Miller's first published story, "My Dinner with Ali," the best essay to have appeared in a newspaper magazine in the U.S. in 1989.  A shorter version of "My Dinner with Ali" was nominated by Sport magazine for the 1990 National Magazine Award and was the inspiration for the creation of The Best American Sports Writing (Houghton Mifflin) yearly anthology.  Houghton Mifflin published Miller's story, "The Zen of Muhammad Ali," in the 1994 edition of The Best American Sports Writing.  

"My Dinner with Ali" was selected by David Halberstam as one of the best twenty pieces of sports writing of the 20th Century and has been anthologized in The Best American Sports Writing of the Century (Houghton Mifflin, 1999), in The Muhammad Ali Reader (Ecco Press, 1998), in The Zen of Muhammad Ali and Other Obsessions (Vintage UK, 2002), and in The Beholder's Eye:  America's Finest Personal Journalism (Grove/Atlantic, 2005)."

Approaching Ali
 (opera)
"My Dinner with Ali" was developed into an opera for the Washington National Opera by composer D. J. Sparr.  Along with Pulitzer Prize-winning librettist Mark Campbell, Davis Miller wrote the libretto for the opera, which received its world premiere in June 2013 at the John F. Kennedy Center for the Performing Arts.  The title of the opera is Approaching Ali.  Performances of the opera have also been produced by the North Carolina Opera.  In January 2022, Opera Las Vegas will premier a production of Approaching Ali in celebration of Muhammad Ali's eightieth birthday.

The Tao of Muhammad Ali

In July 1994, Miller won the first Creative Nonfiction Writers'Project Grant awarded by the North Carolina Arts Council.  The judge for this grant, which Miller used to complete his first book, The Tao of Muhammad Ali, was novelist and National Public Radio book reviewer Alan Cheuse.  

Miller's first book, The Tao of Muhammad Ali: a fathers and sons memoir, was published in hardcover in December 1996 by Warner Books.  The Tao of Muhammad Ali was published in the United Kingdom in February 1997 by Vintage; it reached number one on several English bestseller lists, including those of the Independent (nine weeks) and of the Observer (seven weeks), as well as bestseller lists in both Ireland and Scotland.  

Miller wrote a radio play of The Tao of Muhammad Ali, which was broadcast in six parts in January 1998 by BBC Radio 4.  The Tao of Muhammad Ali was also a bestseller in Japan (Aoyama Publishing).  It was judged the Best Nonfiction Book of 1997 by book reviewers at several of Japan's largest newspapers, including Yomiuri Shimbun and Asahi Shimbun, among others.  In Italy, it won the thirty-sixth annual Premio Bancarella prize for best sports book published in 1999.

The Tao of Bruce Lee:  a martial arts memoir

Miller's second literary memoir, The Tao of Bruce Lee:  a martial arts memoir, about growing up in western North Carolina, about the author's martial arts experiences, and about the ways he has been influenced by Bruce Lee, was published in August 2000 in hardcover by Crown Publishing.  Excerpts from The Tao of Bruce Lee were published in Men's Journal (8,000 words), Washington Post Magazine (3,000 words), Esquire (5,000 words),(London) Independent on Sunday Review (4,000-word cover story), Arena (5,000 words), Panorama magazine (Australia), M Quarterly (Japan), and Melbourne (Australia) Age, among others.  The Tao of Bruce Lee was published by Vintage in the United Kingdom; it rose to number three on the Independents bestseller list (four weeks).  The Tao of Bruce Lee was judged one of the best ten sports books of 2000 by the editors of Booklist magazine.

Short stories and other works
Miller's fiction and nonfiction short stories have been published in Esquire, Rolling Stone, GQ, Men's Journal, Sports Illustrated, and many other American magazines, as well as in Arena (England), United Kingdom editions of Esquire and GQ, in Der Spiegel (Germany), and as cover stories in magazines published by the Boston Globe, Chicago Tribune, Cleveland Plain Dealer, Dallas Morning News, Denver Post, Detroit Free Press, Independent on Sunday (London), Louisville Courier-Journal, Melbourne (Australia) Age, Melbourne (Australia) Herald Sun, Miami Herald, Perth (Australia) Sunday Times, Pittsburgh Post-Gazette, Sydney (Australia) Telegraph, Washington Post, and Western Mail (Cardiff, Wales) among numerous others; and as cover pieces in many publications worldwide, including Features sections of the Chicago Sun-Times, Detroit News, Honolulu Advertiser, Houston Chronicle, Los Angeles Times, Louisville Courier-Journal, (New York) Newsday, (Oklahoma City) Oklahoman, Raleigh News and Observer, Richmond Times-Dispatch, Seattle Times, Sydney (Australia) Morning Herald, Tampa Tribune, Toledo Blade, Washington Post, and various others.  

Miller's stories have been anthologized in The Beholder's Eye:  America's Finest Personal Journalism (Grove/Atlantic, 2005), The Best American Sports Writing of the Century (Houghton Mifflin, 1999), The Muhammad Ali Reader (Ecco Books, 1998), and The Best American Sports Writing 1994 (Houghton Mifflin, 1993), among others.

Miller has also written two ninety-minute documentary films, Bruce Lee:  Curse of the Dragon for Warner Brothers and for the A&E television network, and Death by Misadventure for an independent producer.  In addition, in 2004 Miller was the writer and presenter of a series of thirty-minute documentaries for BBC Radio 4.

Personal life

Miller has four children, Johanna, Isaac, Sam, and Silas. 

Bibliography

The following is a partial list of publications by Davis Miller:

Books

Approaching Ali:  A Reclamation in Three Acts:  W. W. Norton/Liveright, March 2016; Errata Naturae (Spain), September 2016.

The Zen of Muhammad Ali:  and other obsessions:  Vintage UK, January 2003.

The Tao of Bruce Lee:  a martial arts memoir:  Vintage UK, January 2000; Crown Publishing, August 2000.

The Tao of Muhammad Ali:  a fathers and sons memoir:  Warner Books, November 1996; Vintage, UK, February 1997; Aoyama Publishing (Japan), August 1998; Crown Publishing/Three Rivers Press, September 1999.

Anthologized Stories

My Dinner with Ali:  The Muhammad Ali Reader (Ecco Press, 1998); The Best American Sports Writing of the Century (Houghton Mifflin, 1999), The Beholder's Eye:  America's Finest Personal Journalism (Grove/Atlantic, 2005).

The Zen of Muhammad Ali:  The Best American Sports Writing, 1994 (Houghton Mifflin, 1994); GOAT:  The Greatest of All Time, A Tribute to Muhammad Ali (Taschen, 2004).

Literary Nonfiction for Magazines, Newspapers and Radio

Driving with Uncle Aaron (On My Relationship with Aaron Copland):  Thank Goodness It’s Familiar, November 2008; Raleigh News and Observer, September 10, 2006, (Oklahoma City) Oklahoman, October 2, 2006.

Zen Cowboys:  National Public Radio's All Things Considered, April 2007; Austin (Texas) American Statesman, October 8, 1999; Triad Style, October 5, 1999; Louisville Courier-Journal Saturday Magazine, October 2, 1999; Attache magazine, August 1998.

Dancing with Ali:  Melbourne (Australia) Age, February 4, 2007; Los Angeles Times, Detroit News and National Public Radio's All Things Considered, January 17, 2007; Louisville Courier-Journal, (Oklahoma City) 'Oklahoman and Winston-Salem Journal, January 14, 2007.

The Best Father:  Melbourne (Australia) Age, Raleigh News and Observer and (Oklahoma City) Oklahoman, June 17, 2007; San Antonio Express-News, June 18, 2006; Western Mail Saturday Magazine (Cardiff, Wales), June 17, 2006; Washington Post and Boston Globe Magazine, June 2003; Richmond Times-Dispatch and Winston-Salem Journal, June 2002; Candis magazine, May 1998.

My Dinner with Ali:  The Beholder's Eye:  America's Finest Personal Journalism (Grove/Atlantic, 2005); The Best American Sports Writing of the Century (Houghton Mifflin, 1999); The Muhammad Ali Reader (Ecco Press,1998); Winston-Salem Journal and Detroit Free Press Magazine, June 1990; Sport magazine, May 1989; Louisville Courier-Journal Sunday Magazine, January 8, 1989.

The Zen of Muhammad Ali:  GOAT:  The Greatest of All Time, A Tribute to Muhammad Ali (Taschen,2004); The Best American Sports Writing 1994 (Houghton Mifflin); Penthouse (South Africa), July 1994; Playboy (Japan and Germany), March 1994; cover story in 1994 and late 1993 for newspaper magazines published by the Miami Herald, Chicago Tribune, Louisville Courier-Journal, Pittsburgh Post-Gazette, Cleveland Plain Dealer, Independent on Sunday, Melbourne (Australia) Age, Detroit Free Press, Dallas Morning News, Buffalo News, (New York) Newsday, and Denver Post; and as a cover piece for features sections of numerous newspapers, including the Washington Post, Houston Chronicle, Seattle Times, Winston-Salem Journal, Toledo Blade, South Ireland Independent, Sydney (Australia) Morning Herald, Grand Rapids Press, Indianapolis Star, and Folha de S.Paulo (Brazil); Esquire, September 1992.

Bruce Lee, American:  Honolulu Advertiser, August 7, 2003; AMCTV.com, July 2002; Richmond Times Dispatch, June 30, 2002; Hotdog magazine, April 2001; (London) Independent on Sunday Review, December 5, 1999; Winston-Salem Journal, November 17, 1998; Arena, October 1998; M Quarterly (Japan), October 1997; Panorama (Australia), July 1997; Men's Journal, February 1997; Esquire, September 1993.

Wanting to Whup Sugar Ray:  a notable sports story, The Best American Sports Writing, 1992 (Houghton Mifflin, 1992); Sport magazine, March 1991; Washington Post Magazine, February 3, 1991.

Rapture:  Sport magazine, July 1989.

References

Living people
1952 births
20th-century American writers